Taumoepeau is a Tongan surname that may refer to
 
Afusipa Taumoepeau (born 1990), Australian rugby union player
'Alisi Afeaki Taumoepeau, Tongan politician
Charlie Taumoepeau (born 1997), American football player
Mia Taumoepeau, New Zealand based actress
Sifa Taumoepeau (born 1961), Tongan archer 
Saimone Taumoepeau (born 1979), Tongan rugby union player
Sonatane Tuʻa Taumoepeau-Tupou (1943–2013), Tongan diplomat
Tevita Taumoepeau (born 1974), Tongan rugby union player 

Tongan-language surnames